The 2010 African U-17 Women's World Cup Qualifying Tournament was the second edition of the African U-17 Cup of Nations for Women and the first edition of this under-17 qualification tournament new format. The biennial international under-17 football competition organised by the Confederation of African Football (CAF) to determine which women's under-17 national teams from Africa qualify for the FIFA U-17 Women's World Cup.

10 teams entered the competition, but due to many withdrawals, only 5 played matches. The final three teams qualified to the World Cup. The top three teams of the tournament Ghana, Nigeria and South Africa qualified for the 2010 FIFA U-17 Women's World Cup in Trinidad and Tobago as the CAF representatives.

Preliminary round

|}
1 – Both Kenya and Sierra Leone withdrew from competition before the start of the 1st leg. As a result, Botswana and Togo qualified for the next round.

First round

|}
2 – Togo, RD Congo, and Egypt withdrew from competition before the start of the 1st leg. As a result, Nigeria, Tunisia, and Ghana qualified for the next round.

Second round

|}
Nigeria and Ghana qualify for the 2010 FIFA U-17 Women's World Cup held in Trinidad and Tobago.  South Africa and Tunisia will play in a playoff round to determine the last qualifier.

Play-off round

|}
The winner of the play-off round will qualify for the 2010 FIFA U-17 Women's World Cup held in Trinidad and Tobago.

Qualified teams for FIFA U-17 Women's World Cup
The following three teams from CAF qualified for the FIFA U-17 Women's World Cup.

References

External links
African Women U-17 Qualifying Tournament 2010 – rsssf.com

2010
Women's Championship,2010
2010 in women's association football
2010 in youth sport
2010 in youth association football